Lemei Rock is a shield volcano, and part of the Indian Heaven polygenetic volcanic field in Washington, United States. It is located midway between Mount St. Helens and Mount Adams, and dates from the Pleistocene and Holocene.

Geographical setting
Lemei Rock is the highest peak within the Indian Heaven Wilderness in Washington. On clear days hikers can see views of four nearby volcanoes: Mount Adams, Mount Hood, Mount St. Helens, and Mount Rainier.
The shield volcano is topped by a volcanic crater. While the crater rim is free of snow and ice, snow tends to linger on the summit well into July. A small crater lake by the name of Lake Wapiki, occupies the crater below the Lemei Rock high point. The Lost and Dry Creeks flow off of the southeast side of Lemei Rock and join the White Salmon River, while the Smokey, Little Goose, and Cultus flow from the east and northeast side, and joins Trout Lake Creek, which then discharges into the White Salmon River at Trout Lake. The Rush Creek flows from the west side of Lemei Rock and joins the Lewis River between the Lower Lewis River Falls Recreation Area and the Swift Reservoir.

Geology
Lemei Rock is one of the many shield volcanoes topped by cinder cones and spatter cones that make up the Indian Heaven Volcanic Field.

Climbing and recreation

Fishing and hiking destinations in the volcanic field around Lemei Rock include the Indian Heaven Wilderness, which is known for the high mountain meadows among its scattered volcanic peaks. The Pacific Crest National Scenic Trail passes north/south through the volcanic field and the Indian Heaven Wilderness, which is known for its lakes and views of four nearby volcanoes: Mount Adams, Mount Hood, Mount St. Helens, and Mount Rainier. Major trails at Lemei Rock are the Lemei Trail, which climbs up the east side of Lemei Rock; and Wapiki Trail, which descends from the Lemei Trail to the deep blue Wapiki Lake, the "crater lake" of Lemei Rock. The Filloon Trail departs from the rustic Little Goose Campground and meets up with Lemei Trail before Lake Comcomly.

The fifty-site Cultus Creek Campground, a destination for berry pickers, is located right at the edge of the Indian Heaven Wilderness. Cultus Creek Campground offers visitors two major trail heads (Indian Heaven Trail #33 and Cultus Creek Trail #108) and huckleberry picking access to the Indian Heaven Wilderness, known for its huckleberries, and the volcanic field in which it resides.

See also
 Cascade Volcanoes
 List of volcanoes in the United States
 Indian Heaven Wilderness
 Indian Heaven

References

External links

 Gifford Pinchot National Forest - Indian Heaven Wilderness
 USGS - Indian Heaven Volcanic Field
 Lemei Rock
Indian Heaven Wilderness Overview/Background
 Gifford Pinchot National Forest: Cultus Creek Campground
 Trail #34 Lemei Trail
 Printable Indian Heaven Wilderness Trail Vicinity Map (PDF 85 K, Adobe Acrobat)

Cascade Range
Shield volcanoes of the United States
Volcanoes of Washington (state)
Subduction volcanoes
Cascade Volcanoes
Volcanoes of Skamania County, Washington
Pleistocene shield volcanoes
Gifford Pinchot National Forest